William S. Taylor was an American football coach and college athletics administrator. He served as the head football coach at Samuel Huston College in Austin, Texas from 1926 to 1927, Morgan College—now known as Morgan State University—in 1928, Lincoln University in Oxford, Pennsylvania from 1929 to 1931, and Arkansas Agricultural, Mechanical & Normal College (Arkansas AM&N)—now known as the University of Arkansas at Pine Bluff—from 1937 to 1940. Taylor was also the athletic director at Lincoln from 1929 to 1932.

Taylor's 1926 Samuel Huston team won the Southwestern Athletic Conference title.

Head coaching record

References

Year of birth missing
Year of death missing
American football halfbacks
Arkansas–Pine Bluff Golden Lions football coaches
Lincoln Lions athletic directors
Lincoln Lions football coaches
Lincoln Lions football players
Morgan State Bears football coaches
Samuel Huston Dragons football coaches
African-American coaches of American football
African-American players of American football
African-American college athletic directors in the United States
20th-century African-American sportspeople